31 Aquilae (abbreviated 31 Aql) is a star in the equatorial constellation of Aquila. 31 Aquilae is its Flamsteed designation though it also bears the Bayer designation b Aquilae. This star has an apparent visual magnitude of 5.16 and is 49.5 light years from Earth. It has no known companions.

Properties
31 Aquilae has an apparent visual magnitude of 5.16, making it bright enough to be seen with the naked eye in dark skies. It is a variable star with a magnitude change of less than 0.02.

With a stellar classification of G8 IV, the luminosity class of IV indicates this is a subgiant star. Compared to the Sun, it has 116% of the mass and 138% of the radius. It is radiating nearly double the luminosity of the Sun from its outer atmosphere at an effective temperature of 5,510 K, giving it the yellow hue of a G-type star. Its age is probably similar to NGC 188, the oldest open cluster known, which was calculated to be over 5 billion years. For its age, it is surprisingly rich in elements other than hydrogen or helium, contrary to common assumptions that the oldest stars should be metal-poor.

No certain substellar companion has been detected so far around 31 Aquilae. McDonald Observatory team has set limits to the presence of one or more planets  around 31 Aquilae with masses between 0.22 and 1.9 Jupiter masses and average separations spanning between 0.05 and 5.2 Astronomical Units.

Optical companions
The following stars are optical companions that are coincidentally aligned near the line of sight to 31 Aquilae.

References

External links
 The Old Disk Metal-Rich Subgiant 31 Aquilae 
 Image 31 Aquilae
 HR 7373
 CCDM 19249+1157
 R.A. Wittenmeyer et al., "Detection Limits from the McDonald Observatory Planet Search Program", The Astronomical Journal, Volume 132, Issue 1, pp. 177–188, May 2006.

Aquilae, b
Aquilae, 31
182572
Spectroscopic binaries
Aquila (constellation)
G-type subgiants
095447
7373
BD+11 3833
0759